Jordan Henry Grafman (born December 21, 1950) is an American neuropsychologist who serves as Professor of Physical Medicine and Rehabilitation in the Feinberg School of Medicine at Northwestern University. He is also the Director of Brain Injury Research at the Shirley Ryan AbilityLab. Before joining Northwestern and the Shirley Ryan AbilityLab, Grafman served as the director of Traumatic Brain Injury Research at the Kessler Foundation. He also served as Chief of the Cognitive Neuroscience Section at the National Institute of Neurological Disorders and Stroke. His research primarily focuses on investigating the functions of the human prefrontal cortex using a wide variety of methods, including magnetic resonance imaging, psychophysiological techniques, and genetic research. He was awarded a Humboldt Research Award in 2011.

References

External links

 Faculty profile

Living people
1950 births
21st-century American psychologists
Neuropsychologists
Northwestern University faculty
University of Wisconsin–Madison alumni
Humboldt Research Award recipients
20th-century American psychologists